Tatiana Durasova is a former Soviet ice dancer. She was a two-time (1978, 1979) World Junior champion with partner Sergei Ponomarenko.

Competitive highlights 
(with Ponomarenko)

References 

Soviet female ice dancers
Year of birth missing (living people)
Living people
World Junior Figure Skating Championships medalists